Themiscyra may refer to:

 Themiscyra (Pontus), an ancient Greek town, the home of the legendary Amazons
 Themyscira (DC Comics), the fictional island home of DC Comics' Wonder Woman and her fellow Amazons
 Themiscyra Plain, an ancient plain located in modern-day Turkey
 Themiscyra (moth) or Lactura, a genus of ermine moths